Moulton (Lincolnshire) railway station was a station in Moulton, Lincolnshire.  Built by the Norwich and Spalding Railway, (later Midland and Great Northern Joint Railway), opened on 15 November 1858, that closed to passengers on 2 March 1959.

References

External links
 Moulton station on 1946 O. S. map

Disused railway stations in Lincolnshire
Former Midland and Great Northern Joint Railway stations
Railway stations in Great Britain opened in 1858
Railway stations in Great Britain closed in 1959